The 1992–93 Virginia Cavaliers men's basketball team represented University of Virginia as a member of the Atlantic Coast Conference during the 1992–93 NCAA Division I men's basketball season. The team was led by third-year head coach Jeff Jones. The Cavaliers earned an at-large bid to the NCAA tournament as No. 6 seed in the East region. They defeated  in the opening round and No. 3 seed UMass to reach the Sweet Sixteen before falling to No. 2 seed Cincinnati. The Cavaliers finished with a record of 21–10 (9–7 ACC).

Roster

Schedule and results

|-
!colspan=9 style=| Regular season

|-
!colspan=9 style=| ACC Tournament

|-
!colspan=9 style=| NCAA tournament

Rankings

References

Virginia Cavaliers men's basketball seasons
Virginia
Virginia
Virgin
Virgin